Roger Traves (born 15 October 1961) is an Australian cricketer. He played in five first-class matches for Queensland in 1981/82.

See also
 List of Queensland first-class cricketers

References

External links
 

1961 births
Living people
Australian cricketers
Queensland cricketers
Cricketers from Queensland